Ismat ad-Din may refer to:

Ismat ad-Din Khatun (died 1186), also known as Asimat, wife of Nur ad-Din and Saladin
Ismat ad-Din Umm-Khalil Shajar al-Durr (died 1257), Sultana of Egypt

Arabic masculine given names